Utetheisa balinensis is a moth in the family Erebidae. It was described by Rob de Vos in 2007. It is found on the Indonesian islands of Bali and Lombok.

References

Moths described in 2007
balinensis